Tonb Bariku (also Romanized as Tonb Bārīkū; also known as Dam Bārīkū, Dom Bārīkū, and Tam Bārīkū-ye Poshtkū) is a village in Shamil Rural District, Takht District, Bandar Abbas County, Hormozgan Province, Iran. At the 2006 census, its population was 84, in 20 families.

References 

Populated places in Bandar Abbas County